Woodland Township, Illinois may refer to one of the following townships:

 Woodland Township, Carroll County, Illinois
 Woodland Township, Fulton County, Illinois

See also

Woodland Township (disambiguation)

Illinois township disambiguation pages